Alexander Drozdov (born 1 November 1970, Krasnoyarsk) is a Russian political figure and a deputy of the 8th State Duma.

From 1993 to 2016, Alexander Drozdov served in law enforcement. From 2016 to 2021, he served as deputy director for Government Relations and Special Projects of the aluminum division of the Rusal company. On 14 November 2017 he became a member of the United Russia. In 2018 he was elected deputy of the Krasnoyarsk City Council of Deputies. Drozdov left the post in 2021 as he was elected deputy of the 8th State Duma from the Krasnoyarsk constituency. He ran with the United Russia.

Alexander Drozdov is married and has three children.

References

1970 births
Living people
United Russia politicians
21st-century Russian politicians
Eighth convocation members of the State Duma (Russian Federation)